Year 1058 (MLVIII) was a common year starting on Thursday (link will display the full calendar) of the Julian calendar.

Events 
 By place 

 Europe 
 March 17 – King Lulach (the Unfortunate) of Scotland is killed in battle at Lumphanan against his cousin and rival Malcolm III (Canmore) who becomes "king of the Scots".
 September 20 – Empress Agnes de Poitou and King Andrew I (the White) of Hungary meet to negotiate about the border zone in Burgenland (modern Austria).
 The 4-year-old Judith of Swabia, the youngest daughter of the late Emperor Henry III (the Black), is engaged to Prince Solomon of Hungary at Regensburg.
 Norman conquest of southern Italy: Norman forces under Richard Drengot besiege and capture Capua. He takes the princely title from Prince Landulf VIII.
 Bolesław II (the Generous), the eldest son of Casimir I (the Restorer), succeeds his father after his death in Poznań. He becomes duke of Poland.

 Africa 
 The Almoravids conquer the Berghouata, a group of Berber tribes, who have establish an independent state in modern-day Morocco.

 By topic 

 Religion 
 Spring – Pope Stephen IX pronounces on the authenticity of the relics of Mary Magdalene at Vézelay Abbey in Burgundy, making it a major centre of pilgrimage. 
 March 29 – Stephen IX dies of a severe illness after a pontificate of 7-months at Florence. He is succeeded by Nicholas II who will be installed the following year.
 November 6 – Emperor Isaac I (Komnenos) deposes Michael I (Cerularius), patriarch of Constantinople, and has him exiled to Prokonnessos (until 1059).
 Ealdred, archbishop of York, becomes the first English bishop to make a pilgrimage to Jerusalem.

Births 
 Al-Ghazali, Persian theologian and jurist (approximate date)
 Ibn Bassam, Andalusian poet and historian (d. 1147)
 Synadene, queen consort of Hungary (approximate date)
 Theodora Anna Doukaina Selvo, Venetian dogaressa (d. 1083)
 Wynebald de Ballon, Norman nobleman (approximate date)

Deaths 
 March 1 – Ermesinde, countess and regent of Barcelona
 March 17 – Lulach (the Unfortunate), king of Scotland 
 March 29 – Stephen IX, pope of the Catholic Church
 August 2 – Judith of Schweinfurt, duchess of Bohemia
 November 28 – Casimir I, duke of Poland (b. 1016)
 Abdollah ibn Bukhtishu, Syrian physician (b. 940)
 Abu Muhammad al-Yazuri, vizier of the Fatimid Caliphate
 Ælfwold II, bishop of Sherborne (approximate date)
 Al-Mawardi, Abbasid jurist and diplomat (b. 972)
 Boite mac Cináeda (or Bodhe), Scottish prince
 Centule IV Gaston (the Old), viscount of Béarn 
 Egbert of Fulda, German Benedictine abbot
 Fakhruddin As'ad Gurgani, Persian poet and writer
 Flaithem Mac Mael Gaimrid, Irish poet and Chief Ollam
 Grigor Magistros, Armenian prince and governor
 Ilduara Mendes, countess and regent of Portugal
 Theophanu, abbess of Essen and Gerresheim
 William VII (the Bold), duke of Aquitaine (b. 1023)

References